Riga is a town in Monroe County, New York, United States. The population was 5,590 at the 2010 census.

The Town of Riga is southwest of the city of Rochester on the western border of the county. Locally, the town's name is pronounced RYE-ga, instead of REE-ga like the capital of Latvia.

Geography

Riga is bordered on the north by the town of Ogden, on the east by the town of Chili, on the west by Genesee County, and on the south by Genesee County and the town of Wheatland.  Interstate 490 crosses the town.

Demographics

As of the census of 2000, there were 5,437 people, 1,969 households, and 1,518 families residing in the town.  The population density was 154.6 people per square mile (59.7/km2).  There were 2,018 housing units at an average density of 57.4 per square mile (22.2/km2).  The racial makeup of the town was 97.26% White, 0.72% African American, 0.15% Native American, 0.74% Asian, 0.04% Pacific Islander, 0.09% from other races, and 1.01% from two or more races. Hispanic or Latino of any race were 0.92% of the population.

There were 1,969 households, out of which 39.1% had children under the age of 18 living with them, 64.9% were married couples living together, 9.1% had a female householder with no husband present, and 22.9% were non-families. 18.6% of all households were made up of individuals, and 7.6% had someone living alone who was 65 years of age or older.  The average household size was 2.75 and the average family size was 3.15.

In the town, the population was spread out, with 28.3% under the age of 18, 6.1% from 18 to 24, 30.5% from 25 to 44, 25.6% from 45 to 64, and 9.6% who were 65 years of age or older.  The median age was 38 years. For every 100 females, there were 99.2 males.  For every 100 females age 18 and over, there were 93.5 males.

The median income for a household in the town was $58,842, and the median income for a family was $65,106. Males had a median income of $47,083 versus $31,202 for females. The per capita income for the town was $23,590.  About 3.3% of families and 3.8% of the population were below the poverty line, including 2.3% of those under age 18 and 10.7% of those age 65 or over.

History
In the 18th century, the lands of present-day Riga were part of the "Mill Seat Tract" deeded by Native Americans to Phelps and Gorham. Soon thereafter, Robert Morris of Philadelphia acquired the land and sold it to the estate of Sir William Pulteney, 5th Baronet in England.

The Riga area was originally part of Ontario County, set up by the State Legislature in 1789. It later became part of Genesee County. The first organized town between the Genesee River and Lake Erie was Northampton. In 1802, Northampton was divided into Leicester, Batavia, Southampton, Northampton, and East and West Pulteney - after Sir William Pulteney. In 1808 East and West Pulteney became East and West Riga, and in 1809 the Town of Riga was formed.

The Riga Academy was listed on the National Register of Historic Places in 1980.

Government

The town is governed by a Town Board consisting of a Town Supervisor and four Council members, all elected by registered town voters.

Communities and locations in Riga 
Churchville – The Village of Churchville in the northwest part of the town on Route 33.
Churchville Park – A park in the northwest part of the town.
Five Points – A location east of Riga on Route 33A.
Riga (or Riga Center) – The hamlet of Riga is on Route 33A.

References

External links

Rochester metropolitan area, New York
Towns in Monroe County, New York
1808 establishments in New York (state)
Populated places established in 1808